Zabi may refer to:

Geography:
Zabi Rog (literally "Frog's Corner/Frog's Horn"), village in Gmina Morąg, Ostróda County, Warmian-Masurian Voivodeship, Poland
Zabi or Kūh-e Zābī, mountain in western Afghanistan

Anime:
Degwin Sodo Zabi, fictional character in the anime Mobile Suit Gundam universe
Dozle Zabi, fictional character in the anime Mobile Suit Gundam universe
Garma Zabi, fictional character in the anime Mobile Suit Gundam universe
Gihren Zabi, fictional character in the anime Mobile Suit Gundam universe
Kycilia Zabi, fictional character in the anime Mobile Suit Gundam universe
Mineva Lao Zabi, fictional character in the anime Mobile Suit Gundam universe

See also
Jabi
Ksabi
Sabi (disambiguation)
Zabie (disambiguation)
Ząbie